8 is an American play that portrays the closing arguments of Perry v. Schwarzenegger, a federal trial that led to the overturn of Proposition 8, an amendment banning same-sex marriages in California. It was created by Dustin Lance Black in light of the court's denial of a motion to release a video recording of the trial and to give the public a true account of what transpired in the courtroom.

The play is written in the style of verbatim theatre reenactment, using transcripts from the trial, journalist records, and media interviews from the plaintiffs, defendants and proponents involved. 8 first premiered on September 19, 2011 at the Eugene O'Neill Theatre in New York City, and later broadcast worldwide from the Ebell of Los Angeles on March 3, 2012. Black brought the play to San Francisco, the home of the court case on which the play was based, on October 7, 2012 for a one-night-only reading at the ACT Theater. A cast reception following the reading included an appearance by the trial judge, Vaughn Walker. On October 22, 2012, another one-night-only reading was performed at the downtown Crest Theater in Sacramento, California, U.S.

The American Foundation for Equal Rights (AFER) and Broadway Impact, sponsors of the play, have licensed the play for readings nationwide on college campuses and in community theaters free of charge, as an educational tool.

A radio adaptation was broadcast on JOY 94.9, an LGBTIQ community radio station in Melbourne, Australia, on March 27, 2014.

Context
In May 2009, AFER filed a lawsuit, Perry v. Schwarzenegger, in the U.S. District Court for the Northern District of California on behalf of plaintiffs, two same-sex couples, to challenge a voter-approved constitutional amendment, known as Proposition 8, that eliminated same-sex couples' right to marry in the state. The same-sex couples were represented by David Boies and former U.S. Solicitor General Theodore Olson, two high-profile attorneys who opposed each other in the U.S. Supreme Court case, Bush v. Gore.

Characters
The following is a list of the cast of characters, along with the actors that portrayed them in the play's premieres.

The Court
Vaughn R. Walker – Judge
Brad Pitt (Ebell of Los Angeles)
Bob Balaban (Broadway)
Christopher Cabaldon (Sacramento)
Theodore Olson – Lawyer for Plaintiffs
Martin Sheen (Ebell of Los Angeles)
John Lithgow (Broadway)
Ben Patrick Johnson (Sacramento)
David Boies – Lawyer for Plaintiffs
George Clooney (Ebell of Los Angeles)
Morgan Freeman (Broadway)
Kurt Johnson (Sacramento)
Charles J. Cooper – Lawyer for Defense
Kevin Bacon (Ebell of Los Angeles)
 Bradley Whitford (Broadway)
Matt K Miller (Sacramento)
Court Clerk
Vanessa García (Ebell of Los Angeles)
 Kate Shindle (Broadway)
Jessica Goldman (Sacramento)

The Plaintiffs
Kris Perry
Christine Lahti (Ebell of Los Angeles)
Christine Lahti (Broadway)
Sandy Stier
Jamie Lee Curtis (Ebell of Los Angeles)
Ellen Barkin (Broadway)
Spencer Perry – son of Plaintiff
Bridger Zadina (Ebell of Los Angeles)
Jay Armstrong Johnson (Broadway)
Austin Laut (Sacramento)
Elliot Perry – son of Plaintiff
Jansen Panettiere (Ebell of Los Angeles)
Ben Rosenfield (Broadway)
Grant Laut (Sacramento)
Jeff Zarrillo
Matt Bomer (Ebell of Los Angeles)
Matt Bomer (Broadway)
Thai Rivera (Sacramento)
Paul Katami
Matthew Morrison (Ebell of Los Angeles)
Cheyenne Jackson (Broadway)
Evan Brienza (Sacramento)

Witnesses for Plaintiffs
Nancy F. Cott, Ph.D. – (history of marriage)
Yeardley Smith (Ebell of Los Angeles)
Yeardley Smith (Broadway)
Robin Hushbeck (Sacramento)
Gregory M. Herek, Ph.D. – (nature of homosexuality; sexual orientation)
Rory O’Malley (Ebell of Los Angeles)
K. Todd Freeman (Broadway)
Michael RJ Campbell (Sacramento)
Ilan Meyer, Ph.D. – (minority stress; stigma impacts; discrimination)
Jesse Tyler Ferguson (Ebell of Los Angeles)
Anthony Edwards (Broadway)
Eason Donner
Gary Segura – (vulnerability of gays and lesbians in the nation's political process)
James Pickens, Jr. (Ebell of Los Angeles)
Stephen Spinella (Broadway)
Nanci Zoppi (Sacramento)
Ryan Kendall – (forced by parents to undergo "conversion therapy" as a youth)
Chris Colfer (Ebell of Los Angeles)
Rory O'Malley (Broadway)
Patrick Burns

Witnesses for Defense
David Blankenhorn – (marriage is a socially-approved, sexual relationship between man and woman)
John C. Reilly (Ebell of Los Angeles)
Rob Reiner (Broadway)
Steve Minnow (Sacramento)
William Tam – (same-sex marriage leads to polygamy, pedophilia, and incest)
George Takei (Ebell of Los Angeles)
Ken Leung (Broadway)
Ben Phillips

Other Characters
Evan Wolfson – Founder of Freedom to Marry
Cleve Jones (Ebell of Los Angeles)
Larry Kramer (Broadway)
George Raya (Sacramento)
Maggie Gallagher – NOM President (opponent of same-sex marriage)
Jane Lynch (Ebell of Los Angeles)
Jayne Houdyshell (Broadway)
Janis Stevens (Sacramento)
Broadcast Journalist
Campbell Brown (Ebell of Los Angeles)
Campbell Brown (Broadway)

See also

Same-sex marriage in the United States
8: The Mormon Proposition

References

External links

8, the play - Official website
American Foundation for Equal Rights
Transcripts from Perry Trial

Plays by Dustin Lance Black
Courtroom drama plays
Plays set in the 21st century
Plays set in the United States
Plays based on actual events
Broadway plays
LGBT-related plays
Plays about religion and science
Docudrama plays
2008 California Proposition 8
2011 plays